Hexaborane(12) is an inorganic compound with the formula B6H12.  It is an obscure member of the boranes.   It is a colorless liquid that, like most boron hydrides, is readily hydrolyzed and flammable.

The molecular structure conforms to C2 symmetry group.  With the formula BnHn+6, it is classified as an arachno-cluster.  As such the boron positions match six of the boron positions in the closo-B8H.

Preparation 
It is typically prepared by the cluster expansion method from B5H, the conjugate base of pentaborane(9):
LiB5H8  +  1/2 B2H6   →   LiB6H11
LiB6H11 +  HCl   →   B6H12  +  LiCl

References

Boranes